The 2007 Grand Prix de Futsal was the third edition of the international futsal tournament of the same kind as the FIFA Futsal World Cup but with invited nations that took place between 20 and 27 October 2007, in Santa Caterina, Brazil, in three locations:

Joinville (Hall: Centreventos Cau Hansen)
Lages (Hall: Ginásio Jonas Minosso)
Jaraguá do Sul (Hall: Arena Jaraguá)

First stage

Group A

Group B

Group C

Group D

Second stage
Jaraguá do Sul

Quarterfinals

Semifinals

5th/8th Place

1st/4th Place

Finals

7th/8th Place Match

5th/6th Place Match

3rd/4th Place Match

1st/2nd Place Match

Winner

References

Grand Prix de Futsal
Grand Prix de Futsal
Grand Prix De Futsal, 2007